Filippos Karampetsos (born 22. October 1977) is a Greek water polo goalkeeper. At the 2012 Summer Olympics, he competed for the Greece men's national water polo team in the men's event. He is 6 ft 4 inches tall.

See also
 Greece men's Olympic water polo team records and statistics
 List of men's Olympic water polo tournament goalkeepers

References

External links
 

1974 births
Living people
Greek male water polo players
Water polo goalkeepers
Olympic water polo players of Greece
Water polo players at the 2012 Summer Olympics

Ethnikos Piraeus Water Polo Club players
21st-century Greek people